Samuel Laing (1780–1868) from Papdale in Orkney was a Scottish travel writer. He travelled in Scandinavia and northern Germany and published descriptions of these countries. Laing was the first translator of Heimskringla by Snorri Sturluson.

Laing's son, also named Samuel Laing, was a railway administrator and important writer on religion and science, and a Liberal member of parliament. Laing's older brother, Malcolm Laing, was a notable historian. The merchant Gilbert Laing Meason was his older brother as well.

Works
Journal of a residence in Norway during the years 1834, 1835, and 1836, 1836
A tour in Sweden in 1838, 1839
In this work, the author strongly criticises the Swedish-Norwegian union, implying that Norway ought to strive for independence. This caused a comment from the Swedish-Norwegian ambassador in London, M. Björnstierna, On the moral state and political union of Sweden and Norway, 1840.
Notes of a traveller, 1842
Covers journeys in Prussia and other countries. The preface contains a response to Björnstierna.
Heimskringla. The Chronicle of the Kings of Norway, 3 vols., 1844
English translation of the 13th-century Icelandic work by Snorri Sturluson, Heimskringla.

References

External Links 
 MyNDIR (My Norse Digital Image repository) illustrations from Samuel Laing’s translation of Heimskringla.

1780 births
1868 deaths
People from Orkney
19th-century Scottish writers
Scottish travel writers